Perv or PERV may refer to:

Perversion
Porcine endogenous retrovirus
PERVS (Porcine endogenous retroviruses)
The Pervs (fictional characters) from videogame Manhunt 2

See also

 Merv the Perv (fictional character) a 2000s character from Saturday Night Live (SNL)